The Yachi River Bridge is an arch bridge in Guizhou, China. The bridge crosses the Yachi River between Qianxi County in Bijie and Qingzhen in Guiyang. The bridge is part of the Chengdu–Guiyang high-speed railway.

Although Yachi Railway Bridge is officially 272 metres high, the bridge crosses over the reservoir of the Suofengying Dam so it is only approximately 230 metres above the water level.

See also
List of longest arch bridge spans
List of highest bridges in the world

External links
http://www.highestbridges.com/wiki/index.php?title=Yachi_Railway_Bridge

Bridges in Guizhou
Arch bridges in China
Buildings and structures under construction in China
Bridges under construction